The Journal of International Business Studies is a double blind peer-reviewed academic journal and the official publication of the Academy of International Business. It is published by Palgrave Macmillan and covers research on international business. The journal was established in 1970 and is edited by Alain Verbeke (University of Calgary). According to the Journal Citation Reports its 2020 impact factor is 11.382.

JIBS is consistently ranked as one of the highest quality journals in the business and management fields. It is also highly rated by the Social Sciences Citation Index (2020 2-year Impact Factor: 11.382, 5-year Impact Factor: 13.555), and rated as a 4* 'World Elite' journal in the Association of Business Schools’ Academic Journal Guide. It is one of the 50 journals used by Financial Times to determine business school rankings.

Editors 
 1970-1975 - Ernest W. Ogram, Jr.
 1975-1984 - William A. Dymsza
 1985-1992 - David A. Ricks
 1993-1997 - Paul W. Beamish
 1997-2002 - Thomas L. Brewer
 2002-2007 - Arie Y. Lewin
 2007-2010 - Lorraine Eden
 2010-2016 - John Cantwell (Editor in Chief); Mary Yoko Brannen (Deputy Editor) 
 2016-present - Alain Verbeke

On December 22, 2021, Rosalie L. Tung (Simon Fraser University) was announced as the next JIBS Editor-in-Chief. Her term will start on Jan 1, 2023.

Most cited articles 
As of October 2019, the top 5 most cited articles were:

JIBS Decade Award 
The "JIBS Decade Award" was established in 1996  to recognize the most influential paper published in the volume a decade prior. The award is sponsored by Palgrave Macmillan. A selection committee evaluates the five most cited papers of the year and decides on the most influential paper. A special session is held at the Academy of International Business annual conference including a presentation from the award winner and additional commentary. In 2009, the Decade Award was extended to include the 1970-1985 volumes of the journal, .

References

External links 
 
 Academy of International Business

Palgrave Macmillan academic journals
Business and management journals
Publications established in 1970
English-language journals
International business
9 times per year journals